Besuge is a 1976 Indian Kannada-language romance film directed by Geethapriya, based on a novel of the same name by Ashwini, and stars Srinath, Manjula and Chandrashekar, in lead roles.

The film is seen as a landmark in the career of Geethapriya, both as a director and lyricist, and actor Srinath. At the 24th Filmfare Awards South, Srinath was awarded the Best Actor.

Cast
 Srinath 
 Manjula
 Sathyapriya
 Chandrashekar
 Jayalakshmi
 K. S. Ashwath 
 M. V. Rajamma
 K Shivaram

Soundtrack

Vijaya Bhaskar scored the music film's music and for its soundtrack, the lyrics for which were written by Vijaya Narasimha, R. N. Jayagopal, Geethapriya, Shyamsundar Kulkarni and Chi. Udaya Shankar. The soundtrack album consists of six tracks. The track "Besuge", written by Geethapriya, is notable as it has the usage of the word "Besuge" 64 times in it. It is considered of the best songs written by him.

References

1976 films
1970s Kannada-language films
Films based on Indian novels
Indian romance films
Films scored by Vijaya Bhaskar
Kannada literature
Films directed by Geethapriya
1970s romance films

kn:ಬೆಸುಗೆ